Ferenc Tüske (born 21 December 1942) is a Hungarian volleyball player. He competed in the men's tournament at the 1964 Summer Olympics.

References

External links
 

1942 births
Living people
Hungarian men's volleyball players
Olympic volleyball players of Hungary
Volleyball players at the 1964 Summer Olympics
People from Hercegszántó
Sportspeople from Bács-Kiskun County